Héctor Berenguel del Pino (born 11 October 1974), known simply as Héctor, is a Spanish retired footballer who played as a right-back or a central defender, currently assistant manager of AD Alcorcón.

He appeared in 162 La Liga matches in a 16-year professional career, mainly in representation of Deportivo (five seasons). He added 111 games and nine goals in the Segunda División.

Club career
Born in Almería, Andalusia, Héctor started playing with local Polideportivo Almería in the Segunda División B. In 1995 he signed with another side in that tier, Elche CF, achieving promotion to Segunda División two years later.

After Elche got relegated the immediate season after, Héctor returned to his native region and joined Sevilla FC. An everpresent fixture during his three-year tenure he won two promotions to La Liga, scoring a career-high five goals in 2000–01 but also experiencing relegation the previous campaign; his first match in the competition came on 22 August 1999, in a 2–2 home draw against Real Sociedad.

Free agent Héctor signed for Deportivo de La Coruña after the Galicians' league conquest, and proceeded to be relatively used, helping them to the 2002 edition of the Copa del Rey. In summer 2006 he moved to RCD Mallorca in the same league on a two-year contract, where he managed 29 league appearances in his second year, retiring after helping the Balearic Islands team to a final seventh place.

Héctor returned again to his region in the 2009 off-season, taking charge of CD Roquetas' youth academy. In 2011–12 he had his first senior coaching experience, starting the division three season with local Polideportivo Ejido, with the club folding after a couple of months.

Honours
Sevilla
Segunda División: 2000–01

Deportivo
Copa del Rey: 2001–02

References

External links

Deportivo archives

1974 births
Living people
Spanish footballers
Footballers from Almería
Association football defenders
La Liga players
Segunda División players
Segunda División B players
Tercera División players
CP Almería players
Elche CF players
Sevilla FC players
Deportivo de La Coruña players
RCD Mallorca players
Spanish football managers
Segunda División B managers
Polideportivo Ejido managers